The 2018–19 AWIHL season is the 12th season of the Australian Women's Ice Hockey League (AWIHL). It ran from 27 October 2018 until 10 March 2019. Five teams competed in 30 regular season games followed by 4 playoff games, making up the AWIHL Finals weekend. The Melbourne Ice claimed the double by winning both the premiership title for finishing top of the regular season standings and the Joan McKowen Memorial Trophy championship title by winning the grand final. Sydney Sirens finished runner-up to both titles and the Adelaide Rush claimed the wooden spoon.

Teams

In 2018–19 the AWIHL had five teams from five Australian state capital cities competing, stretching east to west of the continent.

League Business

The AWIHL officially expanded for the first time on 9 August 2018, with the admission of expansion team Perth Inferno from Perth, Western Australia. The official AWIHL gameday schedule was released at the end of August 2018. The season structure had changed from 2017–18 thanks to the addition of a fifth team, with each team now playing two of the four opponents in a four-game series with the other two teams being played twice during the season.

Regular season

Fixtures & results
Running between 27 October 2018 and 24 February 2019, the AWIHL regular season consisted of 30 games in total, with teams playing 12 games each.

October

November

December

January

February

Key:

Standings

Player stats
The season's league leader statistics for skaters and goaltenders.

Season awards

Below lists the 2018–19 AWIHL regular season award winners.

Joan McKowen playoffs
The top four teams in the AWIHL regular season qualify for the Joan McKowen Memorial Trophy playoffs. The playoffs is held on a single weekend and uses Australian conventions of being called Finals. The playoff system used by the AWIHL is a four team single game semi-finals and grand final system where the semi-final winners progress to the grand final and the losers playoff for third place. Semi-finals are played on the Saturday and the third place playoff and grand final is played on the Sunday. The prize for being crowned AWIHL Champions for winning the grand final is the Joan McKowen Memorial Trophy.

In 2018–19, the Inferno, Sirens, Goannas and Ice qualified for the finals weekend. The event was held on 9 March to 10 March 2019 in host city Adelaide at the IceArenA. Sydney and Melbourne won the semi-finals on Saturday by comfortable margins to advance to the Joan McKowen grand final. On Sunday Perth defeated Brisbane in the third place playoff to finish their maiden season third with bronze medals. Melbourne beat Sydney to claim the championship title and lift the Joan McKowen Memorial Trophy for a record seventh time.

Semi-finals

Third place playoff

Final

References

External links 
Australian Women's Hockey League
Ice Hockey Australia

Australian Women's Ice Hockey League seasons
Aust
ice hockey
ice hockey